Anna Clendening (born March 12, 1993) is an American singer, actress, and Internet personality, known originally for being one of the most followed people on the now-defunct video sharing service Vine, and later as a contestant on season 9 of America's Got Talent. Now focusing primarily on her music career, Clendening has amassed over 144 million views on her YouTube channel and over 300 million streams on Spotify as of March 2022.

Early life
Clendening was born in Chapel Hill, North Carolina, to parents Vickie Moore Clendening and Michael Clendening. At age 14, Anna was discovered to have severe anxiety and depression. While suffering from panic attacks due to her anxiety, Anna turned to music and began writing and performing songs in her bedroom.

Career
Clendening's debut EP, "waves", was released on February 22, 2019, on the East West Records label. In April 2019, Clendening embarked on The Waves Tour, performing in eight U.S. cities.

In 2019, Clendening is a member of the roster at Sony/ATV's new joint venture, TwentySeven Music Publishing.

She signed the record deal with Atlantic as of June 12, 2020

Personal life
Clendening resides in Los Angeles, California.

Discography

Extended plays

Singles

Filmography

Television

References

Living people
1993 births
American YouTubers
Singers from Los Angeles
Video bloggers
University of North Carolina at Charlotte alumni
Vine (service) celebrities
America's Got Talent contestants
YouTube vloggers
People from Chapel Hill, North Carolina
Singer-songwriters from North Carolina
Actresses from North Carolina
Actresses from Los Angeles
Music YouTubers
American women singer-songwriters
21st-century American women singers
21st-century American singers
21st-century American actresses
Singer-songwriters from California